Serine/threonine-protein kinase Nek8, also known as never in mitosis A-related kinase 8, is an enzyme that in humans is encoded by the NEK8 gene.

Function 

Nek8 is a member of the serine/threonine-specific protein kinase family related to NIMA (never in mitosis, gene A) of Aspergillus nidulans. The encoded protein may play a role in cell cycle progression from G2 to M phase.

Clinical significance 

Mutations in the NEK8 gene associated with nephronophthisis.

References

Further reading

EC 2.7.11
Human proteins